Spin the Wheel may refer to:

 Spin the Wheel (game show), 2019 American game show
 Spin the Wheel (album), 2004 album by Bellefire
Spin the Wheel (Bellefire song)
 Spin the Wheel, 1997 song by The Blackeyed Susans on Spin the Bottle
 Spin The Wheel, Make the Deal, a professional wrestling match type